Michael L. Downs is a United States Air Force major general who serves as the deputy director, intelligence, surveillance and reconnaissance operations of the Joint Staff, replacing Brigadier General Julian Cheater. He most recently served as the vice director of intelligence of the Joint Staff until May 14, 2021. Previously, he was the director of intelligence of United States Forces Korea and United Nations Command. In May 2021, he was promoted to major general.

References

Living people
Place of birth missing (living people)
Recipients of the Defense Superior Service Medal
Recipients of the Legion of Merit
United States Air Force generals
Year of birth missing (living people)